Dame Diana Margaret Ellis  (11 April 1938 – 18 May 2017), known as Di Ellis, was a British rower and the former Honorary President of British Rowing.

Rowing career

Ellis coxed the women's eight at the 1966 European Rowing Championships for Great Britain. She coxed the England women's four to gold in the 1972 home countries match, and won the women's eight head of the river race seven times, four as a cox and three as a rower, from 1966-1973. She won the coxed fours with Janis Long, Ann Shackell, Margaret Goodsman and Beryl Martin, rowing for the St George's Ladies crew, at the inaugural 1972 National Rowing Championships, on the new 2,000-metre course at Holme Pierrepont.

Family
She was the middle child of three daughters born to Robert Hall, a proof reader, and his wife, Mabel (née Steadman), a nurse. She attended Ealing girls' school (West London), and the Guildford College of Technology (in Surrey).

Honours
Ellis was appointed CBE for services to rowing in 2004, and elevated to Dame Commander of the Order of the British Empire (DBE) in the Queen's Birthday Honours List of 2013. She was made a vice-president of the British Olympic Association in 2013 and honorary president of British Rowing in 2014.

Death
Ellis died following a brief illness at the age of 79. She was survived by her husband (since 1966) and daughter.

Affiliations
 British Olympic Association
 Sport & Recreation Alliance
 British Confederation of Sport
 Skills Active
 Sporting Equals and Sports Resolutions

References

1938 births
2017 deaths
British female rowers
Dames Commander of the Order of the British Empire
Sporting dames
Stewards of Henley Royal Regatta
Place of birth missing
Place of death missing